Abbasbəyli (also, Abbasbeyli) is a village in the Qazakh Rayon of Azerbaijan.

References

External links
Satellite map at Maplandia.com 

Populated places in Qazax District